In set theory, König's theorem  states that if the axiom of choice holds, I is a set,  and  are cardinal numbers for every i in I, and  for every i in I, then 

The sum here is the cardinality of the disjoint union of the sets mi, and the product is the cardinality of the Cartesian product. However, without the use of the axiom of choice, the sum and the product cannot be defined as cardinal numbers, and the meaning of the inequality sign would need to be clarified.

Details 

where < means strictly less than in cardinality, i.e. there is an injective function from Ai to Bi, but not one going the other way. The union involved need not be disjoint (a non-disjoint union can't be any bigger than the disjoint version, also assuming the axiom of choice).  In this formulation, König's theorem is equivalent to the axiom of choice.

(Of course, König's theorem is trivial if the cardinal numbers mi and ni are finite and the index set I is finite. If I is empty, then the left sum is the empty sum and therefore 0, while the right product is the empty product and therefore 1).

König's theorem is remarkable because of the strict inequality in the conclusion.  There are many easy rules for the arithmetic of infinite sums and products of cardinals in which one can only conclude a weak inequality ≤, for example:  if  for all i in I, then one can only conclude

Corollaries of König's theorem
 If  is a cardinal, then .
If we take mi = 1, and ni = 2 for each i in κ, then the left side of the above inequality is just κ, while the right side is 2κ, the cardinality of functions from κ to {0, 1}, that is, the cardinality of the power set of κ. Thus, König's theorem gives us an alternate proof of Cantor's theorem. (Historically of course Cantor's theorem was proved much earlier.)

Axiom of choice
One way of stating the axiom of choice is "an arbitrary Cartesian product of non-empty sets is non-empty". Let Bi be a non-empty set for each i in I. Let Ai = {} for each i in I. Thus by König's theorem, we have:
 If , then .
That is, the Cartesian product of the given non-empty sets Bi has a larger cardinality than the sum of empty sets. Thus it is non-empty, which is just what the axiom of choice states. Since the axiom of choice follows from König's theorem, we will use the axiom of choice freely and implicitly when discussing consequences of the theorem.

König's theorem and cofinality
König's theorem has also important consequences for cofinality of cardinal numbers.

 If , then .

Choose a strictly increasing cf(κ)-sequence of ordinals approaching κ. Each of them is less than κ, so their sum, which is κ, is less than the product of cf(κ) copies of κ.

According to Easton's theorem, the next consequence of König's theorem is the only nontrivial constraint on the continuum function for regular cardinals.
Let . Suppose that, contrary to this corollary, . Then using the previous corollary, a contradiction.

A proof of König's theorem
Assuming Zermelo–Fraenkel set theory, including especially the axiom of choice, we can prove the theorem. Remember that we are given , and we want to show :

The axiom of choice implies that the condition A < B is equivalent to the condition that there is no function from A onto B and B is nonempty.
So we are given that there is no function from Ai onto Bi≠{}, and we have to show that any function f from the disjoint union of the As to the product of the Bs is not surjective and that the product is nonempty. That the product is nonempty follows immediately from the axiom of choice and the fact that the factors are nonempty. For each i choose a bi in Bi not in the image of Ai under the composition of f with the projection to Bi. Then the product of the elements bi is not in the image of f, so f does not map the disjoint union of the As onto the product of the Bs.

Notes

References

 
 , reprinted as 

Articles containing proofs
Axiom of choice
Cardinal numbers
Mathematical logic
Theorems in the foundations of mathematics